Inchtuthil is the site of a Roman legionary fortress situated on a natural platform overlooking the north bank of the River Tay southwest of Blairgowrie, Perth and Kinross, Scotland (Roman Caledonia).

It was built in AD 82 or 83 as the advance headquarters for the forces of governor Gnaeus Julius Agricola in his campaign against the Caledonian tribes.

Construction of the large fortress would have taken two or three seasons and a temporary camp was built nearby to house and protect the soldiers over the winter. Additional, smaller forts were built further north and south at the mouth of each nearby glen forming what are now referred to as the Glenblocker forts.

Woolliscroft and Hoffmann  argued that the Glenblocker forts, as well as others in Strathmore, such as Cardean and Stracathro, formed a uniform system composed of several elements, the forts and watchtowers on the Roman road of the Gask Ridge, the Glenblockers and the Strathmore forts. Inchtuthil as the largest military base would have functioned as the lynch-pin and the only site large enough to launch an invasion into the Highlands and beyond.

Layout and garrison
Unlike other legionary fortresses in Britain, Inchtuthil was not later built over and its layout was still largely preserved when Sir Ian Richmond excavated it between 1952 and 1965. It is therefore notable as the site which provides the only complete plan of a legionary fortress anywhere in the Roman empire. 
Its defences consisted of a turf rampart faced with stone, with an outside ditch and gatehouses on each side, following the standard Roman plan. The legion it accommodated would have numbered 5,400 at full strength, though there would have been additional specialist troops accompanying them.

Facilities included a hospital (valetudinarium) that covered 5,000 square metres, a workshop covering 3,500 square metres and 64 barrack buildings. The timber walls of these buildings have been calculated to have had a total perimeter of seven miles (10 km). A headquarters building containing an aedes where the legion's colours and images of the emperor would have been kept has also been identified in the insula in the centre of the fortress. However, it was much smaller than would be expected for a legionary fortress, and must have been of a temporary nature. The large empty insula to its east should have been the site for the Praetorium, the commander's house. However, no signs of building foundations for such a large structure were found though the site had been levelled and prepared.

Inchtuthil was only briefly occupied and was evacuated around summer AD 86 and certainly no later than early in AD 87. The reason for this was probably that Legio II Adiutrix had been called to Moesia from its base in Deva Victrix (Chester) to deal with a Dacian invasion in 86 and XX Valeria Victrix was obliged to move back south to take its place. However recent archaeology has cast some doubt on this, indicating that the fortress may have been in use for considerably longer than previously thought.

The Inchtuthil hoard
When it was excavated in the 1950s by Richmond, a large pit was found in the summer of 1960 containing 875,400 complete iron nails (Square shaft) ranging from  plus another 28 (round shaft nails) weighing 7 tons, together with other iron objects, including cartwheel rims weighing a combined total weight of ten tonnes (Inchtuthil Nails by “Roddy Fraser”). The pit was elaborately concealed, and the nails and ironwork were almost certainly buried by the troops to deny them to the local tribes when they dismantled the fortress before they finally left.

Many of the nails were sent to museums as a gift and the rest of the hoard was sold to the public and other interested organisations with an offer of 5 shillings for a  nail and 25 shillings for a boxed set of five nails. Colville's (Iron and Steel refiners) who had been given the task of sorting and storing the nails state quite clearly that all the complete nails had been "sorted gifted and sold" within 3 years of their discovery, i.e. c.1963.

The almost 2000-year-old iron Inchtuthil nails have been used by atomic scientists to estimate the corrosion effects on barrels of nuclear waste.

Bibliography

 Breeze, D. 1982 Northern Frontiers of Roman Britain. London: Batsford
 Fraser, Roddy. Inchtuthil Nails, A hoard from the Roman Fort. Pub 2018.
 Pitts, L. F. and St.Joseph, J. K. 1985. Inchtuthil. The Roman Legionary Fortress Excavations 1952-65 (Britannia Monograph Series 6). London: Society for the Promotion of Roman Studies.
 Shirley, E. A. M. 1996. "The Building of the Legionary Fortress at Inchtuthil", Britannia Volume 27. pp 111–128.
 Shirley, E. A. M. 2000. The Construction of the Roman Legionary Fortress at Inchtuthil (British Archaeological Reports, British Series 298). Oxford: Archaeopress.
 Woolliscroft, D. J. and Hoffmann, B. 2006.  Rome's first frontier: The Flavian occupation of northern Scotland Stroud: The History Press.
 Angus, N. S., G. T. Brown, and H. F. Cleere. "The iron nails from the Roman legionary fortress at Inchtuthil, Perthshire." Journal of the Iron and Steel Institute 200 (1962): 956–968.
 Miller, William, et al., eds. Geological disposal of radioactive wastes and natural analogues. Vol. 2. Elsevier, 2000. 
 Mattingly, David. "Historical Map and Guide of Roman Britain. Text by S. Esmonde Cleary. Ordnance Survey, Southampton, 2001. Britannia 33 (2002): 383-384. 
 Crossland, I. Corrosion of iron-based alloys–evidence from nature and archaeology. Crossland Report CCL/2006/02, Nirex Ltd, Harwell, UK, 2006.
 Mapelli, Carlo, et al. "Nails of the Roman legionary at Inchtuthil." la metallurgia italiana (2009).

References
 Roddy Fraser. Inchtuthil Nails, A hoard from the Roman Fort. Private Publication (100 copies) 1st pub:October 2018.

External links

 RCAHMS/SCRAN educational site for Inchtuthil
 RCAHMS/SCRAN educational site for the medical facilities at Inchtuthil
 Italian scholarly dissertation, in English, well sourced and illustrated, about Inchtuthil
 The Roman Gask Project
 romanbritain.org Northern Campaigns

83
Buildings and structures completed in the 1st century
1st century in Scotland
Archaeological sites in Perth and Kinross
80s establishments in the Roman Empire
Roman legionary fortresses in Scotland
Scheduled monuments in Scotland